Michele Hoitenga (born July 26, 1969) is an American politician and energy consultant from Michigan. Hoitenga serves as a Republican member of the Michigan Senate, where she represents the 36th district. Hoitenga served as a member of the Michigan House of Representatives from the District 102 from 2017 to 2022.

Early life 
Hoitenga graduated from Buckley High School.

Education 
Hoitenga graduated with a degree in Human Services from Baker College.

Career 
Hoitenga is a former Legislative assistant in Michigan. Hoitenga is an energy consultant.

In 2013, Hoitenga became the mayor of Manton, Michigan until 2016.

On November 8, 2016, Hoitenga won the election and became a Republican member of Michigan House of Representatives for District 102. Hoitenga defeated Douglas Gabert with 69.05% of the votes. On November 6, 2018, as an incumbent, Hoitenga won the election, and continued serving District 102. Hoitenga defeated Dion Adams with 67.77% of the votes. Hoitenga is the chair person of the Communications and Technology Committee.

In 2022, Hoitenga was elected to the Michigan Senate.

Personal life 
Hoitenga's husband is Phillip Hoitenga, oil and gas consultant. They have two children. Hoitenga and her family live in Manton, Michigan.

See also 
 2016 Michigan House of Representatives election
 2018 Michigan House of Representatives election

References

External links 
 Michelle Hoitenga at ballotpedia.org
 Bill 4499
 Michele Hoitenga Wins 20th annual Celebrity Harness Race July 2018
 Hoitenga delivers 2017 Award
 October 26, 2018 interview
 August 2018 Primary Results
 Michele Hoitenga at ourcampaigns.com

1969 births
Living people
Republican Party members of the Michigan House of Representatives
Republican Party Michigan state senators
Women state legislators in Michigan
People from Cadillac, Michigan
21st-century American politicians
21st-century American women politicians